The 2012–12 Suomi-sarja season was the 14th season of the Suomi-sarja, the third level of ice hockey in Finland. 12 teams participated in the league, and RoKi won the championship, however no playoffs were held. They were not promoted to the Mestis league for 2013–14 however and Kotkan Titaanit was relegated to III-divisioona for financial reasons.

First round

Group 1

Group 2

Group 3

Qualification for Final round
Hermes - IPK 2:3, 5:1, 4:1
Waasa Red Ducks - FPS 2:1 OT, 10:5
KOOVEE - Kiekkohait 2:3 OT, 12:4, 3:1

Qualification round

Group 1

Group 2

Group 3

Final round

Relegation round

JHT - NuPS 2:0 (7:4, 3:2)

References
 EliteProspects.com

2012–13 in Finnish ice hockey